The UK Rock & Metal Albums Chart is a record chart which ranks the best-selling rock and heavy metal albums in the United Kingdom. Compiled and published by the Official Charts Company, the data is based on each album's weekly physical sales, digital downloads and streams. In 2006, there were 21 albums that topped the 52 published charts. The first number-one album of the year was In Your Honor, the fifth studio album by Foo Fighters, which was released the previous year and spent the first four weeks of 2006 at number one. The first new number-one album of the year was Yellowcard's fifth studio album Lights and Sounds. The final number-one album of the year was the Aerosmith compilation The Very Best of Aerosmith, which spent the last two weeks of the year at number one.

The most successful album on the UK Rock & Metal Albums Chart in 2006 was Muse's 2006 fourth studio album Black Holes and Revelations, which spent a total of ten weeks at number one over four separate spells. Green Day's 2004 seventh studio album American Idiot was number one for eight weeks in 2006, while Stadium Arcadium by Red Hot Chili Peppers spent seven weeks at number one and was the best-selling rock and metal album of the year, ranking 15th in the UK End of Year Albums Chart. In Your Honor by Foo Fighters and The Black Parade by My Chemical Romance were both number one on the chart for four consecutive weeks, while an additional three albums – Yellowcard's Lights and Sounds, Evanescence's The Open Door and The Very Best of Aerosmith – each spent two weeks at number one in 2006.

Chart history

See also
2006 in British music
List of UK Rock & Metal Singles Chart number ones of 2006

References

External links
Official UK Rock & Metal Albums Chart Top 40 at the Official Charts Company
The Official UK Top 40 Rock Albums at BBC Radio 1

2006 in British music
United Kingdom Rock and Metal Albums
2006